Artemio Precioso may refer to:

 Artemio Precioso Ugarte (1917–2007), Spanish economist and environmentalist
 Artemio Precioso (writer) (1891–1945), Spanish writer and editor